San Antonito is a census-designated place  in Bernalillo County, New Mexico, United States. Its population was 985 as of the 2010 census.

Description
San Antonito Church and Cemetery, which is listed on the National Register of Historic Places, is located in San Antonito.

Education
It is zoned to Albuquerque Public Schools.

See also

 List of census-designated places in New Mexico

References

External links

Census-designated places in New Mexico
Census-designated places in Bernalillo County, New Mexico